Fat Stock Show may refer to:

Houston Livestock Show and Rodeo, its original name
Southwestern Exposition and Livestock Show, an early name for the Fort Worth, Texas-based event